Chaharmahali Turks (Chaharmahali Turkic: چهارمحال ترک‌لاره) are a Turkic people who live in Chaharmahal region of Chaharmahal and Bakhtiari province and speak Chaharmahali Turkic.

Tribes and dialects 
The majority of Chaharmahal Turks are from the Qashqai tribal confederation. The Chaharmahali Turks who are not Qashqai are part of Dareshuri, Nefer, Baharlu, Seljuq, Inanlu, Qizilbash, Bayat, Afshar, Khalaj or Belwardi tribes. Most of Chaharmahali Turks speak Qashqai Turkish and Chaharmahali Turkish, a branch of Oghuz Turkic languages, as well as Persian, the official language of Iran.

Demographics 
Chaharmahal Turks comprise 12.1% of the population of Chaharmahal and Bakhtiari province, and about 30% of the population of Chaharmahal region itself. The majority of their population is in the counties of Saman, Ben, Shahrekord, Borujen and Farsan. They are Shia Muslims.

References 

Ethnic groups in Iran
Ethnic groups in the Middle East
Shia communities
Oghuz Turks